The AMC Javelin is an American front-engine, rear-wheel-drive, two-door hardtop automobile manufactured by American Motors Corporation (AMC) across two generations, 1968 through 1970 and 1971 through 1974 model years. The car was positioned and marketed in the pony car market segment.

Styled by Dick Teague, the Javelin was available in a range of trim and engine levels, from economical pony car to muscle car variants. In addition to manufacture in Kenosha, Wisconsin, Javelins were assembled under license in Germany, Mexico, Philippines, Venezuela, as well as Australia – and were marketed globally. American Motors also offered discounts to U.S. military personnel and cars were taken overseas.

As the winner of Trans-Am race series in 1971, 1972, and 1976, the second-generation AMX variant was the first pony car to be used as a standard vehicle for highway police car duties by an American law enforcement agency.

Development

American Motors' Javelin served as the company's entrant into the "pony car" market. The segment was created by the Ford Mustang even if Ford's car was not the first entry. The Javelin's design evolved from two prototype cars named AMX that were shown in AMC's "Project IV" auto show circuit during 1966. One was a fiberglass two-seat "AMX", and the other was a four-seat "AMX II". Both of these offerings reflected the company's strategy to shed its "economy car" image and appeal to a more youthful, performance-oriented market.

Sales of convertibles were dropping and AMC did not have the resources to design separate fastback and notchback hardtops that were available on the Mustang and on the second-generation Plymouth Barracuda, so the AMC styling team led by Dick Teague penned only one body style, "a smooth semi-fastback roofline that helped set Javelin apart from other pony cars."

The Javelin was built on AMC's "junior" (compact) Rambler American platform only as a two-door hardtop model to be a "hip", dashing, affordable pony car, as well as available in muscle car performance versions. "Despite management's insistence on things like good trunk space and rear-seat room, Teague managed to endow the Javelin with what he termed the wet T-shirt look: voluptuous curves with nary a hint of fat."

First generation

The Javelin debuted on 22 August 1967, for the 1968 model year, and the new models were offered for sale from 26 September 1967, with prices starting at $2,743.

The car incorporated several safety innovations including interior windshield posts that were "the first industry use of fiberglass safety padding", and the flush-mounted paddle-style door handles. To comply with National Highway Traffic Safety Administration (NHTSA) safety standards there were exterior side marker lights, and three-point seat belts and headrests for the front seats, while the interior was devoid of bright trim to help reduce glare.

There were no side vent windows. Flow-through ventilation extracted interior air through apertures in the doors controlled by adjustable flap valves in the bottom of the door armrests. All Javelins came with thin-shell bucket seats and a fully carpeted interior, while the SST model had additional appearance and comfort items that included reclining front seatbacks, simulated wood-grained door panel trim, and a sports-style steering wheel. The Javelin's instruments and controls were set deep in a padded panel, with the rest of the dashboard was set well forward, away from the passenger.

The car's front end had what AMC called a "twin-venturi" look with a recessed honeycomb grille and outboard-mounted headlamps, and matching turn signals were set into the bumper. There was a pair of simulated air scoops on the hood and the windshield was raked at 59 degrees for a "sporty overall appearance."

Road & Track magazine compared a Javelin favorably to its competitors on its introduction in 1968, describing its "big, heavy, super-powerful engine" as "an asset in such a small vehicle", and the styling as "pleasant". Motor Trend, putting the Javelin at the top of the "sports-personal" category in its annual "Car of the Year" issue, said it was "the most significant achievement for an all-new car" and "the most notable new entry in [its] class."

Available only in a two-door hardtop, body style, the Javelin came in base and more premium SST models. Standard engines were a  straight-6 or a  two-barrel carburetor V8. Optional was a  V8 in regular gasoline two-barrel, or high-compression, premium-fuel four-barrel versions. Racing driver Gordon Johncock said the Javelin had "a nice, all-round blend of features", that it "stacks up as a roomy, comfortable, peppy and handsome example of a so-called "pony car" and that after his road test he "wanted to take it home."

A three-speed "Shift-Command" automatic transmission was optional with a center console-mounted gear selector. Forward settings included "1", "2", and a "D" mode that was fully automatic, and the driver could choose to shift manually through all three gears.

The optional "Go Package" included a four-barrel carbureted  AMC V8, power front disc brakes, heavy-duty suspension, dual exhausts with chromed outlets, wide full-length body-side stripes, and E70x14 red-line tires mounted on chrome-plated "Magnum 500" styled road wheels. The largest engine in the first few months of 1968 production was "a 5.6 litre V-8 that delivered 284 SAE bhp, which made the car dangerously fast."

In mid-1968, the new AMX  engine was offered as a "Go-package" option with a floor-mounted automatic or manual four-speed transmission.

American Motors supported the AMX and Javelin muscle-models with a range of factory-approved "Group 19" dealer-installed performance accessories. These included among others, dual four-barrel cross-ram intake manifolds, high-performance camshaft kits, needle-bearing roller rocker arms, and dual-point ignition.

The average age of the "first 1,000 Javelin buyers was 29 – a full ten years under the median for all AMC customers." The Javelin's marketing campaign, created by Mary Wells Lawrence of the Wells, Rich, and Greene agency was innovative and daring in its approach. Print and TV advertisements broke with the traditional convention of not attacking the competition, and some compared the AMC Javelin to the Ford Mustang side by side, as well as showing the Mustang being beaten to pieces with sledgehammers.

The car was longer and roomier than the Ford Mustang, and Chevrolet Camaro, but not the Plymouth Barracuda, and its shape was described as "exciting and beautiful". Total production for the 1968 model year was 55,125.

1969

Minor changes for the second model year included revised side striping and an altered grille with a bull's eye emblem, and trim upgrades. An optional side-stripe package consisted of a C-shaped graphic that started behind the front wheel openings. The optional (standard with the "Go-Package") five-spoke Magnum 500 steel road wheels now came with a stainless steel trim ring. The interior received new door panels and upgraded carpeting. Instrumentation featured a 0–8,000 rpm tachometer that now matched the speedometer in style. Late model-year production received a cowl over the instrument panel directly in front of the driver.

The "Mod Javelin" Package was introduced mid-year in 1969 and included a "Craig Breedlove" roof-mounted spoiler, simulated "exhaust" rocker trim, and twin blacked-out simulated air scoops on the hood. Optional "Big Bad" paint (neon brilliant blue, orange, or green) also became available from mid-1969 and came with matching front and rear painted bumpers, as well as two vertical rubber-faced painted bumper guards for the rear and a special bright lower grille molding for the front bumper. This was part of AMC's targeting youthful consumers as they were "dumping the drab." These bright colors were available on all Javelins through 1970.

The Go-Package option was available with the four-barrel 343 or 390 engines, and continued to include disc brakes, "Twin-Grip" (limited slip) differential, red-line performance E70x14 tires on "Magnum 500" styled wheels, heavy-duty suspension with thicker sway-bars, and other enhancements. Starting in January 1969, four-speed manual transmissions came with a Hurst floor shifter.

Production total for the 1969 model year was 40,675.

Racing

American Motors entered the Javelin in dragstrip and Trans-Am Series racing.

In 1968 Kaplan Engineering (Ron Kaplan and Jim Jeffords) had been contracted by AMC to run two AMC Javelins in the SCCA's Trans-Am series. For 1968, three cars were actually constructed: two for racing and one for shows and demonstrations. In 1969, Jeffords left the team and Kaplan was contracted to run the program. Using his developmental work from the prior year, Kaplan built three more cars, two for AMC and one for himself using his own finances.

For 1968, the initial drivers had been George Follmer (#1) and Peter Revson (#2). Revson was let go part way through the year after a disagreement with management. The team picked up Lothar Motschenbacher for the next two races in Canada.

The first year of the AMC program was a success; the team was written up as a "Cinderella" team. American Motors placed third in the over-2-liter class of the 1968 series, and established a record as the only factory entry to finish every Trans-Am race entered.

For 1968, the team had consistently improved and suffered only one DNF (did not finish) from an engine problem. The race program was supporting a company that had no performance parts, no test facility, and no technical support for the program. As for the production cars, they had no anti-dive potential built into the uni-body; only single-barrel carburetor manifolds; and even when running properly, they did not make as much horsepower as the competitors. The 1968 deal provided Jeffords and Kaplan support from Carl Chakmakian, who was the primary contact on the AMC program.

The performance of the team in 1968 can be attributed to the efforts of Kaplan, his staff, and help from other west coast manufacturers. Kaplan set out to resolve handling problems and fix engine oiling problems. Mid-season, he also started the development of a dual-carburetor cross-ram manifold and (looking ahead) a new engine casting.

The development of the Watt's linkage rear suspension came first. This was followed by the front anti-dive modifications. The development of the anti-dive geometry was actually done quite quickly. To meet AMC's schedule, Kaplan copied the basic design of the inner fender components from a Mustang. He added two more degrees of anti-dive to the Mustang's 4 degrees, made the drawings, and sent them to the factory. The manufacture of the parts was then contracted to Central Stamping. Despite succeeding in developing the parts as a rush job, however, there was no capacity to fit the components to the unibody on the 1969 assembly line, so it fell to Kaplan to incorporate them into the cars when they arrived in his shop as bodies in white. Other related suspension pieces were also acquired through specialty manufacturers who were also building performance parts for Ford.

The building of reliable and powerful engines took a bit more time. The team started the 1968 season with two engines from TRACO. Although TRACO had worked hard to resolve oiling issues and to generate as much power as they could, the single-carb layout and the basic two-bolt-main block were serious limitations.

To develop a cross-ram manifold, Kaplan went to Vic Edelbrock, who not only loaned him a pattern maker but also gave him a lot of personal help. Kaplan was also helped by Champion Spark Plugs who let him use their dyno room to fine-tune and correct any design problems.

Towards the end of 1968, Kaplan enlisted help from Dan Byer, a retired engineer from AMC, for the development of a new block casting. Using the basic AMC 390 drawings, they added more mass for four-bolt mains and improved the oiling system. A run of 50 blocks was contracted to Central Foundries in Windsor, Ontario. Because this was a small run, and there was little factory support, it fell to Kaplan and his staff to clean up the blocks from the sand casting, hone the various passages, and, finally, send them to AMC's "Parts Central" in Kenosha. From there, they could draw on the inventory, as required.

If one were to put a small number of specially cast blocks into the general inventory, chances are pretty good that they would be difficult to find them again, so Kaplan painted all the blocks in bright orange so they could identify them on the transfer line. Kaplan drew on about 12 of these special castings during his development program and two were eventually (much later) sold to customers.

Kaplan's specific preparations included shaving the deck on the new block by about 5/8-inch and heavily modifying the ports. The new cross-ram manifold was installed and Kaplan would add his own specifically designed pistons, a shorter throw crankshaft, and a new camshaft. While a few engines were lost during testing, the whole design proved quite reliable.

In the intervening period, AMC replaced Kaplan's race program contact with two new men (Chris Schoenlip and John Voelbel from Lever Brothers (soap marketing people)), who had no experience in the automotive field and were ignorant of anything to do with racing. They would ultimately prove to be more trouble than they were worth. In fact, it was these two new boys who failed to enter the parts into the official AMC parts system and to submit homologation papers. The importance of this mistake became clear when Kaplan sent the first car to run at the first race of the 1969 season at Jackson, Michigan. Kaplan sent one of the older 1968 cars with a new engine, but, because they were late and had not qualified, the team had to do some consensus-building among the other racers to permit them to enter at all. When the SCCA agreed to let them run, they started last, but, within 10 laps, they were chasing Donohue down and the time differential was narrowing rapidly. After the race, the SCCA asked to see the engine, but he had sent the cars home already. At Lime Rock, the SCCA wanted to tear down the engines before they could start the race. Kaplan bought some time by countering the challenge that they would have to tear down the Camaros and Mustangs too. That was not going to happen, so they were allowed to run. It was clear, however, that the problems with the SCCA were not going away, at least until the parts could be homologated.

AMC did eventually assign a part number (after the SCCA program) and two blocks were later sold to customers.

For 1969, the season started with Ron Grable (#4) and John Martin (#3). This time, it was Martin who was released mid-season. Jerry Grant replaced him in the No. 3 car.

It was at this point that Kaplan approached AMC management and proposed that the concept behind the 1969 contract be modified. He suggested that AMC should not compete in the actual races, since the new engines were not recognized and the old engines were not competitive. Kaplan suggested that they instead go to the tracks on the subsequent Mondays and run a developmental program using Sunday's winning times as the benchmark. AMC did not agree, and Kaplan ran the year with the engines on hand. Because the older-style engines were not competitive, results were poor and, to add insult to injury, there were a series of budget cuts. It was a downward spiral.

Kaplan was having trouble remaining calm about the situation and, after the final race at Riverside, decided he would drop all of AMC's material at their zone office in El Segundo, California, and take a month to think about the next year. When he came back, he found that a deal had already been cut with Roger Penske, and he was out.

Penske picked up the team cars and equipment from the El Segundo offices and shipped everything back to his shop in Pennsylvania. Through the fall of 1969 and into the winter, Penske used the no. 3 Jerry Grant car for developmental purposes. When he acquired the 1969 cars, Penske found that Ron Kaplan had already done considerable work with suspension, but he felt that the front suspension could still be further developed. With Mark Donohue doing the testing, Penske's team lowered the front of the car and replaced the rubber bushings in the radius rods with heim joints. New roll bars were also developed. After several months of development, Donohue felt that the team now had a car that drove like it was on rails.

At this point, Penske built all-new cars for his own team and sold all the earlier Kaplan cars and equipment. Mark Donohue was in charge of selling off the inventory.

Redesign

1970
The 1970 Javelins featured a new front-end design with a wide "twin-venturi" front grille incorporating the headlamps and a longer hood. It also had a new rear end with full-width taillamps and a single center-mounted backup light. This was a one-year-only design. Side marker lights were now shared with several other AMC models. The exterior rearview mirror featured a new "aero" design and in some cases matched the car's body color. The three "Big Bad" exterior paints continued to be optional on the 1970 Javelins, but they now came with regular chrome bumpers. Underneath the restyle was a new front suspension featuring ball joints, upper and lower control arms, coil springs, and shock absorbers above the upper control arms, as well as trailing struts on the lower control arms.

The 1970 AMC Javelins also introduced Corning's new safety glass, which was thinner and lighter than standard laminated windshields. This special glass featured a chemically hardened outer layer. It was produced in Blacksburg, Virginia, in a refitted plant that included tempering, ion exchange, and "fusion process" in new furnaces that Corning had developed in order to be able to supply to the big automakers.

The engine lineup for 1970 was changed with the introduction of two new AMC V8 engines: a base  and an optional  to replace the 290 and the 343 versions. The code remained "X" for the engine on the vehicle identification number (VIN). Also new was the "power blister" hood, featuring two large openings as part of a functional cold ram-air induction system; this was included with the "Go Package" option.

Many buyers selected the "Go Package", available with the 360 and 390 four-barrel V8 engines. This package as in prior years included front disc brakes, a dual exhaust system, heavy-duty suspension with anti-sway bar, improved cooling, 3.54 rear axle ratio, and wide Goodyear white-lettered performance tires on styled road wheels.

The interior for 1970 was also a one-year design featuring a broad dashboard (wood-grained on SST models), new center console, revised interior door panel trim, and tall "clamshell" bucket seats with integral headrests available in vinyl, corduroy, or optional leather upholstery. A new two-spoke steering wheel was available with a "Rim Blow" horn.

It was a close second to the Camaro in terms of ride comfort, while the  engine offered "terrific torque."

Racing
One of the biggest surprises of the 1970 motorsports season was the announcement that Penske Racing had taken over the AMC Javelin program, thus leaving the Camaro Trans-Am program to Jim Hall. American Motors hired Roger Penske and driver Mark Donohue to seriously campaign Javelins in SCCA Trans-Am Series. This coincided with the change in the Trans-Am rulebook allowing manufacturers to de-stroke pre-existing corporate engines, so AMC's  was used as the starting point to meet the  displacement rule that was still in place. The team included former Shelby chassis engineer Chuck Cantwell and a clockwork pit crew. The two-car Javelin effort provided the Bud Moore Ford Boss 302 Mustangs their "closest competition." AMC finished in second place in the Over 2-liter class of the 1970 series.

Capitalizing on the Javelin's successes on the race track, AMC began advertising and promoting special models.

Among these was the "Mark Donohue Javelin SST". A total of 2,501 were built to homologate the Donohue-designed rear ducktail spoiler and were emblazoned with his signature on the right hand side. Designed for Trans Am racing, the rules required factory production of 2,500 spoiler equipped cars. The original plan was to have all Donohue Javelins built in SST trim with the special spoiler, as well as the "Go Package" with Ram Air hood, a choice of a four-speed or automatic transmission on the floor, and a  engine with thicker webbing that allowed it to have four-bolt mains. In the end, the cars were simply fitted with the standard 360 or 390 engines. The cars could be ordered in any color (including "Big Bad" exteriors) and upholstery, as well as with any combination of extra-cost options.

American Motors did not include any specific identification (VIN code, door tag, etc.) and some "Mark Donohue Signature Edition" cars came through with significant differences in equipment from the factory. This makes it easy to replicate, and correspondingly difficult to authenticate a "real" Mark Donohue Javelin.

An estimated 100 "Trans-Am" Javelins replicating Ronnie Kaplan's race cars were also produced. All cars included the  V8 engine with heavy-duty and performance features along with the front and rear spoilers, and were also painted in AMC racing team's distinctive Matador Red, Frost White, and Commodore Blue "hash" paint scheme. Designed to commemorate AMC's entry into SCCA racing, the Trans-Am Javelin's retail price was $3,995.

The strong participation by AMC in Trans-Am and drag racing served to enhance its image, and notable was that its motorsports efforts were achieved on a shoestring budget with the automaker racking up a respectable number of points against its giant competitors. For example, with an estimated 4.5 million participants and 6 million spectators, drag racing was the fastest-growing segment of motorsport in the U.S. The marketing strategy was to appeal to buyers who otherwise would not give AMC a second glance.

Second generation

The AMC Javelin was restyled for the 1971 model year. The "1980-looking Javelin" design was purposely made to give the sporty car "individuality," even at "the risk of scaring some people off."

The second generation became longer, lower, wider, and heavier than its predecessor. The indicated engine power outputs also changed from those that were advertised through 1971, to more realistic calculations starting in 1972. The actual power output of the engine remained the same, but the U.S. automobile industry followed the SAE horsepower rating method that changed from "gross" in 1971 and prior years to "net" in 1972 and later years.

1971
The new design incorporated an integral roof spoiler and sculpted fender bulges. The new body departed from the gentle, tucked-in look of the original.

The media noted the revised front fenders (originally designed to accommodate oversized racing tires) that "bulge up as well as out on this personal sporty car, borrowing lines from the much more expensive Corvette." The new design also featured an "intricate injection moulded grille."

The car's dashboard was asymmetrical, with "functional instrument gauges that wrap around you with cockpit efficiency". This driver-oriented design contrasted with the symmetrical interior of the economy-focused 1966 Hornet (Cavalier) prototype.

The BorgWarner T-10 four-speed manual transmission came with a Hurst floor shifter.

From 1971, the AMX was no longer available as a two-seater. It evolved into a premium high-performance edition of the Javelin.

The new Javelin-AMX incorporated several racing modifications and AMC advertised it as "the closest thing you can buy to a Trans-Am champion". The car had a fiberglass full-width cowl induction hood, as well as spoilers front and rear for high-speed traction. Testing at the Ontario Motor Speedway by Penske Racing Team recorded that the 1971 Javelin AMX's rear spoiler added  of downforce. Mark Donohue also advised AMC to make the AMX's grille flush for improved airflow, thus the performance model received a stainless steel mesh screen over the standard Javelin's deep openings.

The performance-upgrade "Go Package" provided the choice of a 360 or 401 4-barrel engine, and included "Rally-Pac" instruments, a handling package for the suspension, "Twin-Grip" limited-slip differential, heavy-duty cooling, power-assisted disc brakes, white-letter E60x15 Goodyear Polyglas tires (on 15x7-inch styled slotted steel wheels) used on the Rebel Machine, a T-stripe hood decal, and a blacked-out rear taillight panel.

1972
The 1972 model year Javelins featured a new "egg crate" front grille design with a similar pattern repeated on the chrome overlay over the full-width taillights. The AMX version continued with the flush grille. A total of 15 exterior colors were offered with optional side stripes.

To consolidate the product offering, reduce production costs, and offer more value to consumers, the 1972 AMC Javelins were equipped with more standard comfort and convenience items. Engine power ratings were downgraded to the more accurate Society of Automotive Engineers (SAE) net horsepower figures. Automatic transmissions were now the TorqueFlite units sourced from Chrysler, called "Torque-Command" by AMC.

American Motors achieved record sales in 1972 by focusing on quality and including an innovative warranty called the "Buyer Protection Plan" to back its products. Owners were provided with a toll-free telephone number to AMC, as well as a free loaner car if a repair to their car took more than a day.

By this time, the pony car market segment was declining in popularity. One commentator has said that "[d]espite the Javelin's "great lines and commendable road performance, it never quite matched the competition in the sales arena ... primarily because the small independent auto maker did not have the reputation and/or clout to compete with GM, Ford, and Chrysler".

Pierre Cardin
During the 1972 and 1973 model years 4,152 Javelins were produced with optional interior design by fashion designer Pierre Cardin. The official on-sale date was 1 March 1972. The design had multi-colored pleated stripes in red, plum, white, and silver on a black background. Six multi-colored stripes, in a nylon fabric with a stain-resistant silicone finish, ran from the front seats, up the doors, onto the headliner, and down to the rear seats. Chatham Mills produced the fabric for the seat faces. Cardin's crest appeared on the front fenders. MSRP of the option was $84.95 ($ in 2015 dollars). A 2007 magazine article described the design as the "most daring and outlandish" of its kind.

1973
The 1973 Javelin had several updates, most noticeably in the design of the taillights and grille, although the AMX grille remained the same. While all other AMC models had bumpers with telescopic shock absorbers, the Javelin and AMX were fitted with a non-telescopic design that had two rigid rubber guards. These allowed the cars to withstand a  front and  rear impacts without damage to the engine, lights, and safety equipment. The doors were also made stronger to comply with new U.S. National Highway Traffic Safety Administration (NHTSA) safety standards that they withstand  of impact for the first  of crush. The "twin-cove" indentations were eliminated from the Javelin's roof and a full vinyl top was made available. The 1970–1972 "Turtle Back" front seats were replaced by a slimmer, lighter, and more comfortable design that provided more legroom for rear-seat passengers. The SST moniker was dropped, and the car was now simply known as Javelin.

All engines incorporated new emissions controls.

The automaker promoted improved product quality with an advertising campaign that said "we back them better because we build them better". Profits for the year achieved a record high.

Javelin production for the 1973 model year totaled 30,902 units, including 5,707 AMX units.

Trans Am Victory edition
Javelins driven in the Trans-Am captured the racing title for American Motors in both the 1971 and 1972 seasons. The back-to-back SCCA championships with specially prepared race cars was celebrated by AMC by offering a limited run of "Trans Am Victory" edition 1973 Javelins. The package was available on cars built from October to 15 December 1972, on any Javelin SST, except with the Cardin interior. A single magazine advertisement, featuring the winning race drivers George Follmer and Roy Woods, promoted the special package.

These cars came packaged with an additional cost optional visibility group, light group, insulation group, protection group, and sports-style steering wheel, but also received at no additional cost (but valued at $167.45) three other features—large "Javelin Winner Trans Am Championship 1971–1972 SCCA" fender decals on the lower portion behind the front wheel openings, 8-slot rally styled steel wheels with E70X14 Polyglass raised white letter tires and a "Space-Saver" spare tire. The Trans Am Victory cars were also typically pre-built even more "heavily optioned than regular production Javelins." American Motors designed a quick identification system of its models by an information-rich Vehicle Identification Number (VIN) system. However, because this was only a limited promotional "value added" marketing campaign, except as noted on the original window sticker, there is no VIN or door tag code to distinguish an authentic Trans Am-Victory edition car.

1974
By 1974, the automobile marketplace had changed. Mid-year, Chrysler abandoned the pony car market. Whereas Ford replaced its original Mustang with a smaller four-cylinder version, and other pony car manufacturers also downsized engines, the Javelin's big engine option continued until the production of the model ended in October/November 1974 amidst the Arab oil embargo and overall declining interest in high-performance vehicles.

The 1974 AMX did not do as well in the marketplace when compared to the new Camaro, Firebird, and the downsized Mustang II – all of which saw increased sales. Javelin production meanwhile reached a second-generation high of 27,696 units. Out of that total number, a total of 4,980 Javelin-AMX models were produced for the final model year.

A new seatbelt interlock system prevented the car from being started if the driver and a front passenger were unbuckled. Some late-production cars came with hoods made from steel.

Several factors led to the demise of the Javelin model, not the least of which was the economic climate of the time. While the 1974 model was exempt from stricter 1974 bumper standards, AMC estimated it would take $12 million in engineering and design work to revise the bumpers to meet the 1975 standards.

American Motors also introduced the all-new 1974 Matador coupe, described by Popular Mechanics as "smooth and slippery and actually competes with the Javelin for "boss" muscle-car styling". The automaker also needed a manufacturing line to build its all-new AMC Pacer. Nevertheless, more cars were built during the final year of Javelin production than the prior second-generation years, with 27,696 units built, of which 4,980 (about 15 percent) were Javelin AMX models.

Racing
Racing AMC Javelin versions competed successfully in the Trans-Am Series with the Penske Racing/Mark Donohue team, as well as with the Roy Woods ARA team sponsored by American Motors Dealers. The Javelin won the Trans-Am title in 1971, 1972, and 1976. Drivers included George Follmer and Mark Donohue.

One Javelin race car had the distinction of having different sponsors and being piloted by Mark Donohue, Vic Elford, George Follmer, Peter Revson, and Roy Woods. This Javelin actually began life as a 1970 model, but was updated with the exterior body design of 1971 versions. The race car is now restored to its 1972 livery and is driven at Vintage Trans-Am events.

Jim Richards raced a Javelin AMX in the Touring Car Masters in Australia, coming second in the overall 2012 series. He earned second place in the 2015 Touring Car Masters (Pro Masters Class) Series.

Police
In an effort to find a more suitable and lower priced alternative to the traditional large-sized police cruisers, the Alabama Department of Public Safety (ADPS) first took a basic  V8 as a test vehicle, found its power lacking, then sampled a vinyl roofed AMX with a  engine from the local dealer, Reinhart AMC in Montgomery.

Javelins equipped with the  engine proved their performance and beginning in 1971, the Alabama Highway Patrol used them for pursuit and high-speed response calls. The bid price was $3,047 for the 1971 police cruisers, and $3,242 for the 1972 model year versions.

The 132 Javelins purchased during 1971 and 1972 were the first pony cars to be used as a normal highway patrol police car by any U.S. police organization.

The last of ADPS Javelins was retired in 1979. One of the original cars is now part of the Museum at ADPS Headquarters.

International markets
American Motors was active in foreign markets via exports of complete cars as well as joint ventures and partner companies to assemble knock-down versions of its cars.

Australia

Australian Motor Industries (AMI) assembled right hand drive versions of both the first- and second-generation Javelin models in Victoria, Australia from Knock-down kits. The right-hand drive dash, the interior and soft trim, as well as other components, were locally manufactured and differed from the U.S originals. The cars were marketed under the historic Rambler name. The AMI Rambler Javelins were the only American "muscle cars" of that era to be sold new in Australia. The Australian Javelins came with top trim and features that included the   V8 engine, three-speed "Shift Command" automatic transmission, and "Twin Grip" limited-slip rear differential. They were more expensive, had more power, and provided more luxury than the contemporary Holden Monaro.

The first generation Javelin sold for AU$7495 in comparison to rival models the Holden HK Monaro GTS which sold for AU$3790, and the Ford XT Falcon GT which sold for AU$4200. Sales were low and AMI production ceased after 1972 with a total of 258 models built between 1968 and 1972.

From 1964 Rambler sales for New South Wales were managed by Sydney company Grenville Motors Pty Ltd, which was also the State distributor of Rover and Land Rover. A network of Sydney and country NSW dealers were controlled by Grenville that was in direct communication with AMI. Australian-assembled AMC vehicles were otherwise sold in all States by independent distributors.

France
Renault had formerly assembled AMC vehicles until 1967. After Renault ceased production, the AMC Javelin was imported into France by Jacques Poch, the official French importer-distributor of auto brands Škoda and Lada in Neuilly, and one of the two largest private importers of foreign automobiles in France. As with all export markets the Javelin was marketed in France as "Rambler."

Germany
American Motors had an ageement with importer and distributor of Jaguar and Aston Martin cars, Peter Lindner of Frankfurt am Main, to be the exclusive importer of AMC cars into West Germany and offered seven models in the marketplace.

Additionally, Javelins were built for the European market. The German coach builder, Wilhelm Karmann GmbH assembled 280 complete knock down (CKD) Javelins between 1968 and 1970 that were marketed in Europe. This was a significant business relationship because the Javelin was a completely American-designed car that was made in Germany. Karmann's "Javelin 79-K" could be ordered with the  six, the  2-barrel or  4-barrel V8 engines. About 90% of the parts and components came in crates from the United States. At Karmann's facility in Rheine the cars were assembled, painted, and test-driven prior to shipment to customers. A choice of 6 colors were available, exclusive to Europe: White, Cherry Red, Bahama Yellow, Pacific Blue, Bristol Grey, and Irish Green.

Mexico
Vehículos Automotores Mexicanos (VAM) assembled Javelins in Mexico under license and partial ownership (40% equity share) by AMC from 1968 through 1973. The VAM versions were equipped with different, locally made components, trim, and interiors compared to the equivalent AMC-made models. The Mexican built Javelins came in only one version and had more standard equipment compared to U.S. and Canadian models. The Javelin was the first VAM model not to carry the Rambler name for Mexico, AMC's case being the Marlin and Ambassador models in 1966.

1968
The Javelin was not introduced in Mexico by VAM until 1 April 1968, making the model a "1968 and half" similar to the February 1968 debut of the two-seat AMX. The Javelin represented the third line within VAM's product mix for the first time and the first regular production high-end sports-oriented model. It would eventually become the only AMC muscle car to be available in Mexico. Other AMC muscle cars were equivalents built by VAM or as special editions, such as the 1979 American 06/S taking the place of the 1971 Hornet SC/360, the 1972 Classic Brougham hardtop taking the place of the 1970 Rebel Machine, and the 1971 Matador Machine plus the 1969 Shelby Rambler Go Pack the place of the 1969 Hurst SC/Rambler. The Javelin introduced many firsts for VAM, such as a standard four-speed manual transmission and the option for the first time in a regular production model of a three-speed automatic transmission. These were the only transmissions available in the Javelin and only with floor-mounted shifters, just as on the two-seater AMX. Cars with the automatic included a center console with a locking compartment, as well as power drum brakes at no extra cost.

The standard trim and features make the VAM Javelin equivalent to the U.S. and Canadian AMC Javelin SST. Factory options included power drum brakes with a manual transmission, power steering, heater, passenger's side remote mirror, remote-controlled driver's side mirror, custom sport wheels, and rear bumper guards. Dealer installed options included side decals, light group, map pouches, vinyl roof, locking gas cap, license plate frames, mud flaps, AM/FM radio, front disk brakes, heavy-duty adjustable shocks, trunk lid rack, and many others.

A unique dealer-installed option also VAM's own "Go Pack". This consisted of manual front disk brakes, heavy-duty suspension with front sway bar plus rear torsion and traction bars, aluminum four-barrel intake manifold with four-barrel Carter carburetor, headers with equal-length tubes and dual final outlets, dual exhausts, ported head with larger valves, and heavy-duty springs, 302-degree camshaft, Hurst linkage for the manual transmission, "Rallye Pak" auxiliary gauges on the dashboard (different from AMC's original units), exclusive steering wheel, exclusive dual remote mirrors, and exclusive turbine wheels. The performance upgrades of the Go Pack represented a 40% increase in engine output making the VAM Javelin far more competitive against its V8 rivals from Ford de México, General Motors de México, and Automex (Chrysler de México).

Despite the lack of a V8 engine, the VAM Javelin was a success in both sales and among public opinion.

1969
The 1969 VAM Javelin obtained the previously optional heater as standard equipment, the foot pedals received bright trim and the accelerator was changed into a firewall-mounted unit, a support pull strap was applied on the passenger's side dashboard above the glove box, the center cover with the radio speaker grid changed into a woodgrain unit. A unique aspect of the 1969 Javelin is that it kept the same gauge configuration as the 1968 models in contrast to AMC's modifications to the Javelin (and AMX) instrument panel for 1969 with a larger 8,000 RPM tach on the right pod, leaving the smaller left pod exclusive for the clock. The VAM Javelins exterior now had a bright trim package with new moldings starting at the corners of the taillights running on the sides all the way to the lower rear corner of the side glass and drip rails plus all around the rear glass and top edge of the C-pillars. The new Javelins looked more luxurious, even though a factory vinyl roof was not available. The front fender emblems were relocated to the base of each C-pillar and were accompanied by red-white-blue bull's eye emblems. A third Javelin emblem was applied near the lower right corner of the grille. In both standard and Go Pack versions.

1970
The VAM Javelin saw considerable aesthetic changes with only minor technical ones. The VAM models included the same novelties as its AMC counterpart, such as new headlight bezels and grille, smooth front fender extensions and bumpers without divisions, larger tail lights without wraparound portions and a single central backup light, larger side marker lights with both light and reflector sections in both amber and red, and new wheel cover designs resembling Magnum 500 wheels. The discontinuation of the central rear reflector in favor of the backup light resulted in the addition of a fourth Javelin emblem placed on the right corner of the trunk lid. Two hood designs were available, the one with the Ram Air-type scoops at the front center, and a smoother one with the two rectangular stripped bulges. Despite this, no Ram Air system was ever offered for the car, at least at a factory level. In the interior, a new collapsible steering column with a built-in ignition switch and anti-theft lock plus a new simulated two-arm three-spoke sports steering wheel with a central bulls-eye emblem were present. A secondary anti-theft mechanism was present in the form of the floor-mounted shifters being linked to the ignition switch regardless of the transmission type. AMC's new dashboard design included full woodgrain surfaces, complete with a new center console and shifter design for the automatic transmission. However, all three gauges were still the same as in the previous two years. New door panels were also included.

The 1970 VAM Javelins received a new front suspension design with dual control arms and ball joints. Units with four-speed manual transmissions incorporated a Hurst linkage as factory-installed equipment, which was previously available only with the optional Go Pack package and separately in certain dealerships. A mid-year change replaced the imported Borg-Warner T10 manual transmission in favor of the Querétaro-produced TREMEC 170-F four-speed model to comply with the percentages of both local and imported equipment mandated by law.

1971
The year 1971 was vital to VAM as it represented a complete turnaround for the company. The new Camioneta Rambler American based on the Hornet Sportabout was introduced, the Rambler Classic obtained all characteristics of AMC's new Matador, and the Javelin was restyled as a new generation. On the outside, the car was exactly the same as its AMC counterpart with the only exception of the wheels and the lack of factory stripes and decals. A unique characteristic of the second generation VAM Javelin was round porthole opera windows mounted on the C-pillars installed by some VAM dealerships either with or without vinyl roofs.

The standard engine was the new , 9.5:1 compression ratio  I6 engine with Carter ABD two-barrel carburetor. It was VAM's second self-engineered engine, taking the Javelin up to performance levels of its V8 competition. The Go Pack version of this engine took the car to its zenith in terms of performance. The new engine was announced by two "4.6" emblems on both front fenders. The only other technical difference of the new version was a 3.07:1 rear differential gear ratio for units equipped with automatic transmission. The interior saw more changes starting with all-new non-reclining high-back bucket seats with built-in "J" emblems on the seatbacks as well as on the center of the rear seatback. The dashboard was restricted to the unit with woodgrain overlays only; the instrument cluster was once again completely different from the AMC Javelins. The right pod housed a clock and tachometer hybrid with the same design and appearance as the US Rallye Pak units, except that it was tuned for six-cylinder engines. The center pod had a 240 km/h speedometer, a range that put it on par as an equivalent to AMC's 140 MHP unit of the Rallye Pak; but the colors, graphics, and typography of the dial were the same as the standard gauges. This created a high contrast between the speedometer and the clock/tack hybrid. On the left pod were the fuel and water temperature gauges with no oil pressure and ammeter gauges present. Like the AMC Javelins, the car now held a single dome light at the center of the headliner and a new brake pedal design for units with automatic transmission.

1972
All the quality and engineering upgrades and revisions seen on AMC cars for 1972 were also present in Mexico. The 1972 VAM Javelin saw considerable improvements in terms of both performance and sportiness. Heavy-duty springs and shocks along with the front sway bar became standard equipment, as also were power front disk brakes and power steering, all regardless of transmission. Units equipped with the four-speed manual transmission changed to a rear differential gear ratio of 3.31:1 and included a center console with a locking compartment as standard equipment. The "Shift-Command" Borg-Warner automatic transmissions were replaced by the new "Torque Command" Chrysler-built A998 TorqueFlite. The chromed grille applied on the tail light lenses and the new rectangular grid front grille of the AMC Javelins arrived for the VAM models. The exterior included for the first time factory stripe designs. The interior saw new seat patterns and a new three-spoke sports steering wheel with an "American Motors" legend on the transparent plastic cap of the horn button. A new steering column design with a built-in safety lever to engage the steering lock came and the mechanism blocking the shifter to the ignition switch departed.

1973
For the 1973 model year, the VAM Javelin received cosmetic changes. The car incorporated the new smaller rectangular grille design with integrated rectangular parking lights and mesh grille, open-air vents under the front of the fenders for cooling the brakes, the "TV screen" taillight design with a larger central bulls-eye emblem between them, and new original seat patterns. Mechanically, the car was the same as the year before with the only exception of a new engine head design with larger valves and independent rockers without a flute-type shaft. Except for the lack of intake porting, these heads were the same units used in the Go Pack engines. These were the most powerful VAM Javelins ever made in stock condition. Similar to the Mexican originals, the second-generation Javelins were not available with cowl induction hoods as the AMC Javelins in any form. Sales of this year went down from the previous seasons and the beginning of engine emission certification scheduled by the Mexican government the following year would take a toll on all high-compression gasoline engines produced in the country. This started to threaten not just the Javelin, but all performance cars produced in Mexico. All this plus the need to open a space to introduce the Gremlin line and the company's perception that the new Matador coupe model could take the position as the image builder and enthusiast generator of the marque prompted VAM to discontinue the Javelin at the end of the 1973 model year production, one year before AMC's production of the Javelin ended in the U.S.

Philippines 
While the Philippines was almost exclusively an American car market until 1941, the post-WWII years saw an influx of European cars enter the market. Despite a saturation of international brands, American Motors Corporation managed to establish a presence and the Rambler Classic and Rambler American were locally assembled in the Philippines by Luzon Machineries in Manila. Luzon Machineries later assembled the 1968 through 1970 AMC Javelins. The Javelin was one of only two "pony cars" to ever be available in the Philippines, the other being the Chevrolet Camaro. The Philippine-assembled Javelin came with AMC's 258 cu in 6-cylinder engines only. In 1970 Luzon Machineries began to end passenger vehicle manufacturing and for 1970 only a dozen Javelins were produced.

Switzerland 
Beginning in 1970 Zurich automotive importer J.H Heller AG began importing the Javelin, along with the Gremlin and later the Pacer. Swiss market vehicles were shipped from AMC's Canadian plant.

United Kingdom
American Motors exported factory right-hand-drive vehicles to the United Kingdom which were built at the Brampton plant in Ontario, Canada. These were marketed in the U.K by Rambler Motors (A.M.C.) Ltd in Chiswick, West London. The Chiswick plant had previously assembled Hudson, Essex, and Terraplane vehicles since 1926 and had become a subsidiary of AMC in 1961, thereafter importing complete AMC vehicles. The Chiswick depot also became the Rambler parts center for the United Kingdom, Europe, and the Middle East. They also kept parts for Hudson and the English-built Austin Metropolitan.

For 1968, the U.K market Javelin was available only in left-hand-drive. From 1969 U.K-market Javelins were exported in factory right-hand-drive.

Venezuela 
Constructora Venezolana de Vehículos C.A. of Venezuela was a subsidiary of AMC beginning in 1967. The firm assembled AMC Javelins from 1968 until 1974 in its Caracas, Venezuela facility.

The Venezuelan 1968 Javelin was equipped with the  V8 engine.

For the 1972–1974 (second-generation) Javelins, the only powertrain available for the Venezuelan market was AMC's  with 4-barrel carburetor coupled to the Chrysler automatic transmission.

Legacy and collectibility
The Javelin is among the "highly prized" models among AMC fans.

The Chicago Sun-Times auto editor Dan Jedlicka wrote that the Javelin, which he describes as "beautifully sculpted" and "one of the best-looking cars of the 1960s", is "finally gaining the respect of collectors, along with higher prices." The first generation Javelin has also been described as a "fun and affordable American classic with a rich racing pedigree and style that will always stand out from the omnipresent packs of Ford, General Motors, and Chrysler pony cars."

The AMC Javelin does not command the high prices of some other muscle cars and pony cars, but offers the same kind of style and spirit for collectors. However, in its day the car sold in respectable numbers, regularly outselling both the Plymouth Barracuda and Dodge Challenger that are popular with collectors today.

The Antique Automobile Club of America (AACA) divides the "muscle" AMC Javelins into two categories: Class 36-e for 1968–69 Javelin base and SST models equipped from the factory with  4-barrel or larger V8 engines; and Class 36-j for 1970–74 Javelin, SST, and AMX models equipped from the factory with  four-barrel or larger V8 engines. Javelins built with smaller engines compete in the regular AMC classes according to their respective decade of production.

According to estimates from the 2006 Collector Car Price Guide some of the desirable extras include the V8 engines, particularly the 390 and 401 versions, as well as the "Go" package, and special models including the "Big Bad" color versions. The 1971 through 1974 AMX versions also command higher prices, according to several collector price guides. The 1973 Trans Am Victory edition also adds a premium in several classic car appraisal listings, but the distinguishing decal was readily available and it has been added to many Javelins over the years.

The book Keith Martin's Guide to Car Collecting describes the cars as providing "style, power, nostalgia, and fun by venturing off the beaten path ... these overlooked cars offer great value" and includes the 1971–1974 Javelins as one of "nine muscle car sleepers."

Both first- and second-generation Javelins have been modified for more speed, handling, or acceleration. Some have been built as race-legal or race-ready tribute cars or replicas made to resemble AMC’s factory-backed Trans-Am racers.

There are active AMC automobile clubs, including owners interested in dragstrip and racing in vintage events such as the National American Motors Drivers & Racers Association (NAMDRA). The Javelin shared numerous mechanical, body, and trim parts with other AMC models, and there are vendors specializing at AMC shows and swap meets specializing in new old stock (NOS) as well as reproduction components.

Hellcat-powered AMC Javelin AMX
Ringbrothers of Spring Green, Wisconsin, built a custom 1972 AMC Javelin AMX powered by a "Hellcat" Hemi for the 2017 Specialty Equipment Market Association SEMA show. The 6.2-liter Hemi Mopar engine is fitted with a Whipple 4.5-liter supercharger and tuned to Wegner Motorsports to produce . The car was built for Prestone and is called "Defiant".

Notes

References

External links

 
 
 
 

Javelin
Pony cars
Muscle cars
Rear-wheel-drive vehicles
Coupés
1970s cars
Cars introduced in 1968